"Let Me Be Your Fantasy" is a song by British musical group Baby D. It was written and produced by band member Floyd Dyce and the vocals were sung by Dorothy Fearon (also known as Dorothy "Dee" Galdes and Dee Galdes-Fearon). It was originally released by Production House Records in October 1992, when it reached  76 on the UK Singles Chart. In November 1994, London Records subsidiary Systematic re-released the song, and it subsequently became a UK No. 1 hit for two weeks. A partially black-and-white music video was produced to promote the single. 

In 1996, it was included on the group's only album, Deliverance. Same year, it earned an award for Best Dance Tune at the International Dance Music Awards in London. And Mixmag ranked it No. 42 in their ranking of the "100 Greatest Dance Singles of All Time". The rave track is now widely regarded as a classic of its genre. Dyce has said "My idea for Fantasy was to try to develop an original song on top of hard beats: something you could sing along to as you were raving."

Chart performance
"Let Me Be Your Fantasy" only reached No. 76 when first released on 26 October 1992 by the independent Production House Records. It remained popular however, and the single was reissued in the UK on 7 November 1994 by London Records subsidiary Systematic Records, after a sale of 20,000 units on the Production House label. It entered the chart at No. 3 before climbing to No. 1 the following week, where it remained for two weeks. It was the 18th best-selling single of 1994 in the UK. On the Eurochart Hot 100, "Let Me Be Your Fantasy" peaked at No. 5 in December 1994. It was also a top 20 hit in Finland, the Netherlands, Sweden and Switzerland. The song was released for a third time in 2000 as a UK garage remix by Trick or Treat. This version, featuring MC Tails, peaked at No. 16.

Critical reception
Larry Flick from Billboard wrote, "Now here is a melting pot of street vibes. Hip hop-induced break beats percolate beneath aggressive, rave-ish keyboards while Baby D purrs and pouts like a peppy pop ingenue. The end result is a gem of a single with a left-of-center quality that endears after repeated listens. Could become a sleeper smash with the right amount of promotional TLC." Tom Ewing of Freaky Trigger called the song "uplifting, always ready to drop in a big hook, keeping the rushy spirit of UK house alive." He stated that "its breakbeat undercarriage gives "Let Me Be" a rough, robust chunkiness which plays well off Baby D's powerful vocals." 

James Masterton said in his weekly UK chart commentary, that "Let Me Be Your Fantasy" "is the closest thing the underground dance scene has to a long lost classic." Maria Jimenez from Music & Media declared it as a "techno houser", adding, "Don't miss the beat". Alan Jones from Music Week rated the song four out of five, adding, "Somewhere between house, garage and techno, it's sure to score." Jake Barnes from Muzik deemed it as "jungle-lite". James Hamilton from the RM Dance Update described it as a "plaintive girl wailed galloper", with its "episodic spurting stop/start 0-134.8-0bpm".

Music video
The accompanying music video for "Let Me Be Your Fantasy" is mostly made in black-and-white, but some scenes are shown in colours. In many scenes, singer Dorothy Fearon is seen in the middle of three lit candles on each side. Other scenes show the two male members of Baby D or several dancers performing choreography. Sometimes these are also seen in the middle of the six lit candles. A woman with a long head scarf and a couple, both with bald heads, also appear in the video. Some scenes are made to look like billowing water, with Fearon wearing black sunglasses in the background.

Impact and legacy
"Let Me Be Your Fantasy" earned an award for Best Dance Tune at the 1996 International Dance Music Awards in London. Same year, British electronic music and clubbing magazine Mixmag ranked the song No. 42 in its "100 Greatest Dance Singles of All Time" list, adding,

"It took almost three years for Let Me Be Your Fantasy to worm its way into the British public's affections, to shift from hardcore anthem to chart topping smash. In retrospect, the only thing that's surprising is that it took so long. Let Me Be Your Fantasy - a sneaky paen to ecstasy's 'warm embrace' disguised as a love song - was perhaps the most commercial tune that the hardcore scene ever produced. Massive pianos, crunching breaks and a ravealong chorus meant its appeal spread wider than white gloved Vicks sniffers. Far enough, in fact, to get it voted the Kiss listeners' favourite tune of all time in a recent poll."

In 2011, MTV Dance placed the song at No. 13 in their list of "The 100 Biggest 90's Dance Anthems of All Time". In 2015, Sam Richards from The Guardian wrote that "Let Me Be Your Fantasy was the biggest crossover hit of the rave era." In 2018, Mixmag listed "Let Me Be Your Fantasy" as one of "The 30 Best Vocal House Anthems Ever", and The Vinyl Factory included the song in their list of "10 Essential Piano-driven UK Rave Records From 1990-1994". In 2020, The Guardian ranked the song No. 76 in their list of "The 100 Greatest UK No 1s", writing: 
"The lyrics are essentially a QVC infomercial for the eroto-psychedelic effects of ecstasy – 'Lotions of love flow through your hands / See visions, colours every day' – and the music is shamelessly designed to intensify drug experiences. The junglist breakbeats keep the energy high, while the big piano chords and yearning vocals are like a head massage from some bloke you just met but nevertheless now feel a deeper kinship with than your immediate family."

Track listing
 UK CD single - 1994 issue on Systematic Records [SYSCD4]
 Radio Edit
 Original Mix
 Dancing Divaz Club Mix
 Ruffer Remix
 Cool Breeze Slow + Low Remix
 DJ Professor's X Club Mix
 Ray Keith Remix

Charts

Original version

Weekly charts

Year-end charts

Trick or Treat remix

Certifications

Cover versions
 In 2007, the song was covered by German trance project 4 Clubbers.
 In 2010, Pictureplane sampled the whole song in his version titled "Beyond Fantasy".
 In 2020, the song was covered by Gok Wan and Craig Knight and featured vocals by Kele Le Roc.
 In 2022, the song was covered by MODE12 and featured vocals by Daniel Pearce (as DTale).

References

1992 songs
1992 singles
1994 singles
2000 singles
Baby D (dance group) songs
Music Week number-one dance singles
UK Singles Chart number-one singles
Production House Records singles